The following highways are numbered 159:

Canada
 Prince Edward Island Route 159 (Peter Road)
 Quebec Route 159

Costa Rica
 National Route 159

Japan
 Japan National Route 159

United States
 U.S. Route 159
 Alabama State Route 159
 Arkansas Highway 159
 California State Route 159 (former)
 Colorado State Highway 159
 Connecticut Route 159
 Florida State Road 159
 Georgia State Route 159
 Illinois Route 159
 Indiana State Road 159
 Kentucky Route 159
 Louisiana Highway 159
 Maine State Route 159
 Maryland Route 159 
 Massachusetts Route 159
 Nevada State Route 159
 New Jersey Route 159
 New Mexico State Road 159
 New York State Route 159
 North Carolina Highway 159
 Ohio State Route 159
 Pennsylvania Route 159 (former)
 Tennessee State Route 159
 Texas State Highway 159
 Texas State Highway Spur 159
 Utah State Route 159
 Virginia State Route 159
 Wisconsin Highway 159
 Wyoming Highway 159
Territories
 Puerto Rico Highway 159